Clarence R. Magney  (January 11, 1883 – May 13, 1962) was an American attorney, lawyer, and jurist who served as the mayor of Duluth from 1917 to 1920 and associate justice of the Minnesota Supreme Court from 1943 to 1953.

Early life and education 
Born in Trenton, Pierce County, Wisconsin, Magney went to public schools in Bayport, Minnesota. He then graduated from Gustavus Adolphus College in 1903 and Harvard Law School in 1908.

Career 
After graduating from law school, Magney worked as an attorney at Jenswold & Jenswold in Duluth. He was elected mayor of Duluth in 1917 and served until 1920. He was later elected to serve as a district court judge. Magney was appointed as an associate justice of the Minnesota Supreme Court in 1943 and served until 1953. He was instrumental in getting a number of state parks and scenic waysides established along the North Shore of Lake Superior. Judge C. R. Magney State Park is named for him. After retiring as a justice, he continued to work as commissioner of the Minnesota Supreme Court until his death in 1962.

Personal life 
His father, Jonas Magney (surname originally Magnuson), immigrated to the United States from Sweden in 1858. He was the first student at Gustavus and upon graduation became ordained as a Lutheran pastor.

See also
List of mayors of Duluth, Minnesota

References

External links 
The Papers of the Magney Family are available for research use at the Gustavus Adolphus College and Lutheran Church Archives.

1883 births
1962 deaths
People from Pierce County, Wisconsin
Mayors of Duluth, Minnesota
Justices of the Minnesota Supreme Court
Gustavus Adolphus College alumni
Harvard Law School alumni